Charles Benoit Koffi Acolatse (born 5 May 1995), known as Charles Acolatse, is a French-born Togolese professional footballer who plays as a midfielder for Dacia Unirea Brăila.

International career
While playing in Romania at Liga II team Foresta Suceava, Charles Acolatse was called up to play for the Togo national football team by coach Claude Le Roy in November 2017, making his debut in a friendly game against Mauritius.

References

External links
 
 
 
 Charles Acolatse at lpf.ro

1995 births
Living people
Footballers from Paris
French sportspeople of Togolese descent
Citizens of Togo through descent
Togolese footballers
Association football midfielders
Vannes OC players
Championnat National players
Vendée Poiré-sur-Vie Football players
Les Herbiers VF players
Liga I players
Liga II players
ACS Foresta Suceava players
ASC Daco-Getica București players
AFC Turris-Oltul Turnu Măgurele players
FC Dunărea Călărași players
FC Universitatea Cluj players
AFC Dacia Unirea Brăila players
Macedonian First Football League players
FK Sileks players
Togolese expatriate footballers
Togolese expatriate sportspeople in Romania
Expatriate footballers in Romania
Togolese expatriate sportspeople in North Macedonia
Expatriate footballers in North Macedonia
Togo international footballers